Thomas Rostollan (born 18 March 1986) is a French former professional road racing cyclist, who rode professionally in 2013 and 2014 for , and in 2016 and 2017 for the  team.

Major results

2008
 1st Overall Grand Prix Chantal Biya
1st Young rider classification
1st Stage 1
2009
 1st Stage 1 Vuelta a Navarra
2010
 2nd Overall Circuit des Ardennes
2012
 2nd Overall An Post Rás
1st Stage 5
 4th Scandinavian Race Uppsala
2014
 1st  Sprints classification Tour du Gévaudan Languedoc-Roussillon
 10th Overall Paris–Arras Tour
2015
 1st Grand Prix Cristal Energie
 1st Mountains classification Tour du Loir-et-Cher
2016
 1st Stage 6 Tour de Bretagne
2017
 5th Overall Tour du Loir-et-Cher
 7th Overall Rás Tailteann

References

External links

1986 births
Living people
French male cyclists